Samu Manoa (born March 5, 1985) is an American rugby union player who plays for the Seattle Seawolves in Major League Rugby (MLR). 
Manoa was described in 2014 by ESPNscrum.com as "perhaps the finest No. 8 playing the game in the northern hemisphere." He retired from international rugby in 2019 with 22 caps.

Early career
Manoa was born in Concord, California. He started playing rugby at 13 years old with his family. His coaches through his early years were his father and his uncle, Va'inga Manoa and Hu'ufifale (himself a rugby star in his youth in Tonga before emigrating to Hawaii). Manoa played for San Francisco Golden Gate RFC from 2003-2011. He helped SFGG win the U.S. Rugby Super League in 2009 and 2011 crossing four times in the process. In his final game for the Golden Gate, Manoa again showed his nose for the tryline, opening the scoring as his side claimed the title once more. San Francisco Golden Gate were national runners up in 2010.

Professional rugby

English Premiership

In April 2011 Manoa signed for English Premiership side Northampton Saints for the 2011–12 season. Northampton were impressed with his ball skills, pace and physicality.
In autumn 2011 Manoa hit the ground running for the Saints with a series of powerful performances in the early rounds of Premiership Rugby and worked himself into Northampton's starting rotation. A series of outstanding performances earned him man of the match awards in wins over Castres and Harlequins, and the big second row fast became an integral part of the Saints squad. Over the course of the 2011-12 season, Manoa played in 18 Premiership games for the Saints, with 14 starts. Manoa was named by ESPN to the 2011-12 Premiership "Dream Team."

On February 15, 2012 Manoa signed a three-year contract extension with Northampton Saints. He was honoured with the Northampton Saints Supporters' Player of the Year for the 2012-13 Premiership season. During the 2013-14 season Manoa replicated his success and subsequently was short-listed for the RPA Player's Player of the Year award and the Premiership Player of the Year. Furthermore, for the second year in succession Manoa was voted the Saints Supporters' Player of the Season. In 2014 Manoa started as Northampton beat Saracens to win the Premiership. He achieved his first English Premiership hat trick on October 11, 2014 as Northampton dominated Sale Sharks 43-10. Just two months later he achieved another hat trick in a substitute appearance in which Saints drubbed Benetton Treviso 67-0 in the European Rugby Champions Cup. On the back of several strong performances in the Premiership and Champions Cup, Manoa won the Premiership Player of the Month for December 2014.

Top 14
On December 21, 2014, Toulon owner, Mourad Boudjellal confirmed that Manoa signed with Toulon on a four-year contract, the first type of contract to be offered by the club. One week after making his debut for Toulon, Manoa scored his first try for the club in their 52-8 win over Montpellier in November 2015.

Major League Rugby
Manoa has played with the Seattle Seawolves of Major League Rugby since 2019.

Internationals

United States national team
Manoa played six matches with the U.S. Select XV and the USA A sides from 2009 to 2010, including playing in the Americas Rugby Championship. He was called up to the U.S. national team for the 2010 end of year tests. He earned his US international debut with a start against Georgia in November 2010, and also started matches against Scotland A and Saracens. His 2011 contract with Northampton meant that he did not play for the US in the 2011 Rugby World Cup. Manoa retired from international rugby prior to the 2019 World Cup with intention of continuing his club career playing for the Seattle Seawolves.

Barbarians
On 1 June 2013 Manoa gained his first cap for the Barbarians playing against the Lions in Hong Kong.

Club Statistics

Personal life

Manoa is married to Mary-Lorraine Masi'ata Lavaka-Manoa [Nee Tasini] with whom he has five children.

Samu Manoa's full name is Samuela Va'inga Manoa. He is of Tongan descent, and is the eldest son of Va`inga-`i-Moana Manoa and Patricia Dixon Mataele. Manoa's father was a star athlete at Santa Ana High School. Manoa's paternal grandfather and namesake, Samuela Mafana Ikani Manoa ("Mafana"), was a star rugby player from the village of Nukunuku in Tonga. His paternal grandmother, Kalolaine Tupou Veiongo Manoa [nee Aholelei] reared Manoa and took him as a toddler to Tonga, so his mother could continue with school. Manoa has two siblings on his father's side, a brother Wesley, and a sister, Lilio Daphne. Manoa's grandfather captained the South Seas Islanders during the 60s, and his father was also an international.

References

External links

1985 births
Living people
American rugby union players
United States international rugby union players
American people of Tongan descent
RC Toulonnais players
American expatriate rugby union players
Expatriate rugby union players in England
American expatriate sportspeople in Wales
Northampton Saints players
Rugby union locks
Rugby union flankers
Rugby union number eights
Cardiff Rugby players
Seattle Seawolves players
Sportspeople from California
American expatriate sportspeople in England
American expatriate sportspeople in France
Expatriate rugby union players in Wales
Expatriate rugby union players in France
People from Concord, California